This is a list of reggae fusion artists. This includes artists who have either been very important to the genre, or have had a considerable amount of exposure (such as in the case of one that has been on a major label). Bands are listed by the first letter in their name (not including the words "a", "an", or "the"), and individuals are listed by last name.



#
2face Idibia
311

A
Ace of Base
Aidonia
Andru Donalds
Astro
Audio Active
Ava Leigh

B
Bad Brains
Barrington Levy
Beenie Man
Born Jamericans
Bounty Killer
Brick & Lace
Bridgit Mendler
Buju Banton
Busy Signal
Bryan Art

C
Cham
Che'Nelle
Cherine Anderson
Christopher Martin
Chronixx
Collie Buddz
Colle´ Kharis
Costi Ioniță

D
Damian Marley
Demarco
Dirty Heads
Diana King
Don Yute
Dr.Alban
Dub War

E
Ego-Wrappin'
Elephant Man
Empire ISIS
Enur
Emblem3

G
Gentleman
Gyptian

H
Heavy D
The Holdup

I
Ini Kamoze
Inner Circle
Iyaz

J
Jagatara
Jah Cure
Jazmine Sullivan
Junior Reid

K
K'naan
Kardinal Offishall
Ky-Mani Marley

L
Lady Saw
Laza Morgan
Let's Go Bowling

M
Mad Cobra
Mad Lion
Magic!
Major Lazer
Matisyahu
Maxi Priest
Mavado (singer)
Men at Work
Michael Franti & Spearhead
The Movement
Mr. Vegas
Ms. Triniti

N
Natasja Saad
Nahko and Medicine for the People
No Doubt
No-Maddz

O
Olly Murs
Ocean Alley

P
Patra
The Police
Popcaan
Pepper
Protoje

R
Rayvon
Reel Big Fish
Richie Stephens
Rihanna
Rikrok

S
Sadiki
Sean Kingston
Sean Paul
Seeed
Serani
Shabba Ranks
Shaggy
Shinehead
Sizzla
Skindred
The Skints
Slightly Stoopid
Snoop Lion
Snow
Spice
Stick Figure
Sticky Fingers
Sublime
Super Cat

T
T.O.K.
Tami Chynn
Teacha Dee
Tessanne Chin
Third World
Tony Rebel

U
UB40

V
Voicemail
Vybz Kartel

W
Walk off the Earth
Wayne Marshall
Wayne Wonder

Z
Zeroscape

 01
Reggae fusion